Tap Seac Square is a major public square in São Lázaro, Macau, China. It stood on the site of a former stadium and was completed in 2007. Amongst others, the buildings of the Macau Central Library, the Cultural Institute and the Macau Historic Archives are located around the square.

Gallery

See also
 List of tourist attractions in Macau

References

Squares in Macau
2007 establishments in Macau